Idaea demissaria, the red-bordered wave moth, is a species of geometrid moth in the family Geometridae. It is found in North America.

The MONA or Hodges number for Idaea demissaria is 7114.

Subspecies
These three subspecies belong to the species Idaea demissaria:
 Idaea demissaria columbia McDunnough, 1927
 Idaea demissaria demissaria
 Idaea demissaria ferrugata Packard, 1876

References

Further reading

External links

 

Sterrhini
Articles created by Qbugbot
Moths described in 1831